Nils Esbjörnsson Reuterholm (1676–1756) was the governor of Dalarna in Sweden from 1732 to 1739 and then the governor of Örebro from 1739 to 1756.

He was made a member of the Royal Swedish Academy of Sciences in the year of its foundation, 1739.

Swedish politicians
Governors of Örebro County
Members of the Royal Swedish Academy of Sciences
1676 births
1756 deaths
Age of Liberty people